The Sampur Power Station (also called Trincomalee Coal Power Plant or TCPP) was a proposed coal-fired power station that was planned to be built in Sampur, Trincomalee, Sri Lanka.  

The MoU for the first  phase was signed on 29 December 2006, between the Government of Sri Lanka, Ceylon Electricity Board and the National Thermal Power Corporation India. The Power Purchase Agreement, Implementation Agreement, BOI Agreement, Land Lease Agreement and Coal Supply Agreement were signed on 7 October 2013 by relevant parties including the Government of Sri Lanka, the Ceylon Electricity Board and the Trincomalee Power Company Limited. The Government of Sri Lanka had agreed that, after the commissioning of this power station, no more coal-fired power stations will be commissioned in Sri Lanka. 

However the construction of the power station was delayed for ten years by various issues including licensing. In September 2016, the Sri Lankan Supreme Court was informed by the Ministry of Power and Renewable Energy that the proposed coal power station would not be constructed in Sampur, after a Fundamental Rights application was filed in May 2016 by an environmental organization.

See also 
 Energy in Sri Lanka
 List of power stations in Sri Lanka

References 

Coal-fired power stations in Sri Lanka
Buildings and structures in Trincomalee District